Georgia competed in the Winter Olympic Games as an independent country for the first time at the 1994 Winter Olympics in Lillehammer, Norway.

Competitors
The following is the list of number of competitors in the Games.

Alpine skiing 

Men

Luge

Ski jumping

References

Official Olympic Reports

Nations at the 1994 Winter Olympics
1994
Winter